Chondroitin sulfate synthase 1 is an enzyme that in humans is encoded by the CHSY1 gene.

CHSY1 synthesizes chondroitin sulfate, a glycosaminoglycan expressed on the surface of most cells and in extracellular matrices. Glycosaminoglycan chains are covalently linked to a wide range of core protein families and regulate many biologic processes, including cell proliferation and recognition, extracellular matrix deposition, and morphogenesis.

References

External links

Further reading